Agridia is a village in the Limassol District of Cyprus, located  south of Chandria.

History
Agridia is a small village of the Region of Pitsilia, in the Lemesos District. It is the ninth highest village in Cyprus, built on an altitude of 1100 m above sea level.

The village has two churches dedicated to Prophet Elias. These include a small chapel built on a hill, and a large church in the center of the village.

Further reading
 Giorgos Karouzis, Strolling around Cyprus, Lemesos, City and District, Lefkosia 2001

References

Communities in Limassol District